The 1963 Florida State Seminoles football team represented Florida State University in the 1963 NCAA University Division football season. This was Bill Peterson's fourth year as head coach, and he led the team to a 4–5–1 record.

While an FSU student and before he became famous as lead vocalist for The Doors, Jim Morrison was arrested for public drunkenness, resisting arrest, and disturbing the peace at the September 28 game against TCU.

Schedule

Roster
WR Fred Biletnikoff, Jr.

References

Florida State
Florida State Seminoles football seasons
Florida State Seminoles football